Yekaterina Ivanovna Zelenko (– 12 September 1941) was a Soviet Su-2 pilot who flew during the Winter War and World War II. She remains the only woman ever alleged to have performed an aerial ramming, though in recent years historians have begun to question the credibility of such reports.

Early life 
Zelenko was born in 1916 to a Russian family in the village of Koroshchine, then part of the Volhynian Governorate of the Russian Empire. She completed seven grades of school in Kursk before moving with her mother to Voronezh, where she entered the Voronezh Secondary Flying School. In October 1933 she graduated from the Voronezh Flying Club and was sent to the 3rd Orenburg Military Flying Academy named after Kliment Voroshilov.

In December 1934, she graduated with honors and was posted to Kharkiv on assignment to the 19th Light Bomber Brigade. From January 1936 until April 1938, she was assigned to the 14th Squadron of the Kharkov military district, after which she was assigned to the 4th Light Bomber Regiment, and from February to March 1940 she participated in the Winter War as a R-Zet pilot in the 11th Light Bomber Regiment. She flew eight missions during the conflict, for which she was awarded the Order of the Red Banner.

World War II 
On the eve of the German invasion of the Soviet Union Zelenko was taking part in the retraining of the leading personnel of seven aviation regiments in use of the Sukhoi Su-2.

According to the official version of events in 1990, the events leading to her death went as follows: On 12 September 1941, Zelenko's Su-2 was attacked by seven Bf 109s. After shooting down two of them she ran out of ammunition so she launched a downward ramming which tore a Messerschmitt Bf 109 in two as the propeller of her plane hit the German aircraft's tail. According to some accounts the Su-2 exploded, while other reports state she maintained control of her plane until it was shot down by another Bf 109.

Her husband Pavel Ignatenko died in an aviation accident in 1943.

While it is undisputed that she flew 40 missions on the Su-2 and engaged in 12 aerial combats, many aviation historians from both Russia and the US strongly doubt or outright disagree with the claim that Zelenko actually committed an aerial ramming, pointing out major discrepancies in the accounts describing her alleged ramming. Her first nomination for the title Hero of the Soviet Union did not mention an aerial ramming at all; claims about the location of the ramming itself, the location of her final resting place, and the evidence that was used to conclude that she conducted the ramming have been brought into question. For flying 40 missions she qualified for the title Hero of the Soviet Union, but because she went missing she was initially just awarded the Order of Lenin.

Awards and recognition 

Awards
 Hero of the Soviet Union (5 May 1990)
 Two Orders of Lenin (29 December 1941 and 5 May 1990)
 Order of the Red Banner (19 May 1940)

Memorials and recognitions

 The minor planet 1900 Katyusha was named in her honor.
 Her portrait appeared on a Soviet envelope in 1983 before she was awarded the title Hero of the Soviet Union, and later on a 2014 postage stamp of the Russian Federation. (pictured)
 There are streets bearing her name as well as various monuments and statues in her honor throughout Russia and Ukraine.

See also

 List of female Heroes of the Soviet Union

References

Bibliography
 
 

1916 births
1941 deaths
Women aviators
Women military aviators
Heroes of the Soviet Union
Soviet Air Force officers
Soviet military personnel killed in World War II
Soviet World War II bomber pilots
Winter War pilots
Russian aviators
Soviet women in World War II
Russian women
Pilots who performed an aerial ramming
Women air force personnel of the Soviet Union
Soviet women aviators
Recipients of the Order of Lenin
Recipients of the Order of the Red Banner
People from Zhytomyr Oblast